Alan or Allan Horsfall (5 August 1926 – 24 May 2007) was an English professional rugby league footballer who played in the 1940s and 1950s.

Playing career
Alan Horsfall's début for Leeds came in the 17–32 defeat by Wigan at Headingley on 24 November 1945, he was transferred to Castleford on Monday 10 January 1955 in part-exchange for Joe Anderson, and was the bag man for the Leeds teams of the 1970s, and early 1980s.

References

External links
Search for "Horsfall" at rugbyleagueproject.org

Alan Horsfall RIP

1926 births
2007 deaths
Castleford Tigers players
English rugby league players
Leeds Rhinos players
Rugby league players from Leeds
Rugby league props